Plinia oblongata, commonly known as  (sour jabuticaba), is a species of plant in the family Myrtaceae. It is endemic to south-eastern Brazil. The tree grows to between 4 and 6 metres tall, and produces dark-purple, acidic but edible fruit, which is between 25 and 30mm in diameter.

References

oblongata
Crops originating from the Americas
Crops originating from Brazil
Tropical fruit
Endemic flora of Brazil
Fruits originating in South America
Cauliflory
Fruit trees
Berries